Johannes Schleeter, O.F.M. (died 29 May 1457) was a Roman Catholic prelate who served as the Auxiliary Bishop of Cologne (1434–1457).

Biography
Johannes Schleeter was born in Dortmund, Germany and was ordained a priest in the Order of Friars Minor.
On 24 Oct 1434, he was appointed during the papacy of Pope Eugene IV as Titular Bishop of Venecompensis and Auxiliary Bishop of Cologne. 
He served as Auxiliary Bishop of Cologne until his death on 29 May 1457.

References

External links and additional sources
 (for Chronology of Bishops) 
 (for Chronology of Bishops) 
 (for Chronology of Bishops)  

15th-century German Roman Catholic bishops
Bishops appointed by Pope Eugene IV
1457 deaths
Franciscan bishops